"To Get Down" is a song performed by Timo Maas from his album Loud. featuring the vocals of Phil Barnes. It became a hit in the United Kingdom, peaking at No. 14 on the UK Singles Chart and topping the UK Dance and Indie charts. It also reached No. 4 on the US Billboard Hot Dance Club Play chart. The song is featured in the 2003 film The Italian Job and the 2002 video game FIFA Football 2003; the latter being remixed by Fatboy Slim.

Track listing
UK CD
 "To Get Down" (Radio Mix) - 3:32
 "To Get Down" (Fatboy Slim Mix)
 "To Get Down (Rock Thing)" (Timo's Dub Mix)

Official versions
 "To Get Down" (Radio Mix) - 3:32
 "To Get Down" (Fatboy Slim Mix)
 "To Get Down (Rock Thing)" (Timo's Dub Mix)

Charts

Weekly charts

Year-end charts

References

 

2001 singles
2001 songs
Perfecto Records singles
Timo Maas songs
UK Independent Singles Chart number-one singles